Dhar Assembly constituency is one of the 230 Vidhan Sabha (Legislative Assembly) constituencies of Madhya Pradesh state in central India.

It is part of Dhar District.

Members of the Legislative Assembly

Election results
2018
Neena Vikram Verma	BJP	Winner	93,180	49%	5,718
Prabha Balmukundsingh Goutam	INC	Runner Up	87,462	46%	

2013
Neena Vikram Verma	BJP	Winner	85,624	50%	11,482
Kunw. Balmukund Singh Gautam	INC	Runner Up	74,142	43%	

2008
Balmukund Singh Goutam	INC	Winner	50,510	47%	
Neena Vikram Verma	BJP	Runner Up	50,509	47%	1

2003
Jaswant Singh Rathore (advocate)	BJP	Winner	80,732	56%	29,851
Karan Singh Pawar	INC	Runner Up	50,881	35%	

1998
Karansingh Pawar	INC	Winner	53,862	49%	147
Vikram Verma	BJP	Runner Up	53,715	49%	

1993
Vikram Verma	BJP	Winner	42,514	44%	14,713
Karan Singh Panwar	INC	Runner Up	36,058	38%	

1990
Vikram Verma	BJP	Winner	50,294	57%	15,506
Mohan Singh Bundela	INC	Runner Up	34,788	39%	

1985
Mohansingh Bundela	INC	Winner	36,844	57%	11,882
Vikram Verma	BJP	Runner Up	24,962	39%	

1980
Vikaram Varma	BJP	Winner	24,112	49%	3,450
Surendra Singh Neemkhera	INC(I)	Runner Up	20,662	42%	

1977
Vikram Verma	JNP	Winner	28,176	67%	15,780
Surendrasingh Neemkheda	INC	Runner Up	12,396	29%

See also
 Dhar

References

Assembly constituencies of Madhya Pradesh